Žan Luka Zelko (born 4 November 1994) is a Slovenian sailor. He competed in the Laser event at the 2020 Summer Olympics.

References

External links
 

1994 births
Living people
Slovenian male sailors (sport)
Olympic sailors of Slovenia
Sailors at the 2020 Summer Olympics – Laser
Place of birth missing (living people)
Sailors at the 2010 Summer Youth Olympics
21st-century Slovenian people